Tatsuya Tanigawa (谷川 達也（ - Tanigawa Tatsuya; born September 2, 1971) is a Japanese professional racing driver.

Racing record

Complete JGTC/Super GT results

Complete Japanese Touring Car Championship (1994-) results

References 

Japanese racing drivers
Japanese Formula 3 Championship drivers
1971 births
Living people
Super GT drivers